Simeon I of Yerevan or Simeon Yerevantsi (1710 – July 26, 1780) was the Catholicos of All Armenians from 1763 to 1780. In 1771, he founded a printing press at the Etchmiadzin Cathedral, the first in Armenia. According to Rouben Paul Adalian, the pontificate of Simeon I of Yerevan marked the reemergence of Etchmiadzin as a "truly important center of Armenian national affairs".

Biography

Simeon I was born in 1710 in Yerevan, then under Safavid Iranian rule. According to his contemporaries and 19th-century sources, his family was of noble origin. He received his education at the monastic school in Etchmiadzin, where he studied with his predecessor as catholicos, Hakob Shamakhetsi, and eventually joined the teaching staff. As a legate of the Holy See of Etchmiadzin, he travelled to Istanbul, New Julfa and Madras, the last of which was an important center of Armenian intellectual activity at the time.

He was elected catholicos at Etchmiadzin in 1763. At the time, due to the remoteness of Etchmiadzin in a frontier province of Iran, the Armenian Patriarchate of Istanbul had become the most important see of the Armenian Church. Simeon took active efforts in order to increase the role of the See of Etchmiadzin and reassert its primacy over the other sees, including by establishing a printing press in 1771, the very first on the territory of historical Armenia. Four years later he established a paper factory to meet the growing needs and costs of the printing press. He furthermore improved the monastic school, which would become a major center of theological learning in the 19th century.

Catholicos Simeon was particularly hostile towards Armenian Catholics and sought to prevent the spread of Catholicism among Armenians, frequently and harshly criticizing them in his written works. He was opposed to the activities of Indian Armenians Shahamir Shahamirian and Joseph Emin, who envisioned the reestablishment of an independent Armenian state.

Simeon I died on July 26, 1780, on the holiday of Vardavar. In accordance with his wishes, his former student Ghukas I Karnetsi was elected his successor as catholicos.

References

Notes

Citations

Sources
 
 
 
 
 
 

1710 births
1780 deaths
Catholicoi of Armenia
Persian Armenians
18th-century people of Safavid Iran